Soft Maple Reservoir is a reservoir located by Eagle Falls, New York. Fish species present in the lake are tiger muskie, white sucker, pickerel, smallmouth bass, rock bass, yellow perch, and black bullhead. There is a carry down on Soft Maple Road, on the southwest shore.

Locations and tributaries

Engle Pond – A bay of Soft Maple Reservoir, located north of the dam.
Soft Maple Dam Pond – An 89-acre lake located west of the reservoir. It is the secondary outflow of the Soft Maple Reservoir. There is access to the pond via a small channel from Soft Maple Reservoir.

References

Reservoirs in New York (state)